This is a list of the main career statistics of tennis player Amélie Mauresmo.

Singles performance timeline

Significant finals

Grand Slam

Singles: 3 finals (2 titles, 1 runner-up)

Doubles: 1 final (1 runner-up)

Olympics

Singles: 1 medal round (1 silver medal)

Tour Finals

Singles: 3 finals (1 title, 2 runner-ups)

WTA Tour finals

Singles: 48 (25 titles, 23 runners-up)

Doubles (3 titles, 1 runner-up)

ITF finals

Singles: 3 (2 titles, 1 runner–up)

Doubles: 4 (2 titles, 2 runner–ups)

WTA Tour career earnings

Head-to-head record against other players

Head-to-head vs. top 10 ranked players

No. 1 wins

Top 10 wins

Longest winning streak

16-match win streak (2001)

Notes

External links
 

Mauresmo, Amelie